John Herman Merivale (1 December 1917 – 6 February 1990) was a Canadian-born British theatre actor, and occasional supporting player in British films.

Born in Toronto, Ontario, Canada, John Merivale was the son of English actors Philip Merivale and Viva Birkett. His stepmother was the English actress Gladys Cooper. Merivale was educated in England, at Rugby and New College, Oxford. 

Merivale made his acting debut at age 15, playing the small role of a newsboy in James Whale's The Invisible Man (1933). His stage career started when he was 21, as an understudy in a production of A Midsummer Night's Dream, where he first met Vivien Leigh. He later worked in the production of Romeo and Juliet by Leigh and her husband, Laurence Olivier. 

Merivale's career was put on hold while he served as a pilot with both the British and Canadian air forces during World War II. He resumed his career in 1946, with a starring role in a successful U.S. production of Oscar Wilde's Lady Windermere's Fan.

In 1956 Merivale made his second film appearance, in The Battle of the River Plate. He went on to have supporting roles in films such as A Night to Remember (1958), Circus of Horrors (1960), House of Mystery (1961), The List of Adrian Messenger (1963), (where he played the title character, who is killed thirteen minutes into the film), King Rat (1965), and Arabesque (1966).

Although Merivale had the leading role in the Italian horror film Caltiki - il mostro immortale (1959), he tended to concentrate on theatre work, in such productions as Venus Observed, Anne of the Thousand Days, The Reluctant Debutante and The Last of Mrs. Cheyney.

He was married to the US actress Jan Sterling from 1941 until 1948, and lived with Vivien Leigh from 1960 until her death in 1967, becoming her dedicated caretaker in her final years. He began a relationship with actress Dinah Sheridan in 1968; they married in 1986.

Merivale died in 1990 from kidney failure.

Filmography

References

External links
 
 
 
 John Merivale at Vivien-Leigh.com

English male film actors
English male stage actors
1917 births
1990 deaths
Male actors from Toronto
People educated at Rugby School
Alumni of New College, Oxford
Canadian emigrants to the United Kingdom
Royal Air Force personnel of World War II
Royal Canadian Air Force personnel of World War II
20th-century English male actors
Canadian people of English descent